Robbe is an international company specialising in kits for model aircraft, boats and cars.

Robbe may also refer to:

 Robbe (surname), a surname
 Robbe De Hert (born 1942), Belgian film director
 Robert "Robbe" Helenius (born 1984), Finnish boxer

See also

 Robbe-Grillet